Ion Balan (born May 1, 1962, Lingura, Cantemir) is a Moldovan politician, deputy in the Parliament of the Republic of Moldova since 2009.

Biography 
Since 1989 he has been a district counselor in Cantemir. Since 2007 he is a member, then a deputy chairman of the LDPM. Together with his brother Vasile, he is the founder of the church in his home town.

Distinctions and orders
 2000 - The "Civic Merit" Medal
 2006 - Order of the 2nd Grade of the "Paisie Velicicovski" for the work for the good of the Orthodox Church in Moldova.

References

External links 
 Ion Balan - Partidul Liberal Democrat din Moldova
 Ion BALAN
 Site-ul Parlamentului Republicii Moldova
 Site-ul Partidului Liberal

1962 births
Living people
Liberal Democratic Party of Moldova MPs
Moldovan MPs 2009–2010